Zachary Zarba (born April 28, 1975) is a professional basketball referee in the National Basketball Association. His first season was in 2004. He wore uniform number 58 until the 2012–2013 season, when he changed to 28. Zach currently wears uniform number 15. Zach Zarba has officiated 697 regular season NBA games, 27 playoff games, and three Finals games during his 11-year career. Zarba worked the 2016 NBA All-Star Game in Toronto, Canada on February 14.

Background
Zarba was born in Brooklyn, New York and attended the public schools there, graduating from Midwood High School. Prior to joining the NBA, Zarba officiated in the NBA Development League for two years, where he was part of the crew that officiated the 2003 D-League Finals. He also spent one year officiating in the CBA and two years officiating in the IBL.

Zarba has three years of collegiate officiating experience in the ACC, SEC, Colonial, ASUN, OVC and NEC Conferences. In addition, he has three years of high school officiating experience in New York.

While at New Paltz, Zarba was a member of the basketball team and was named captain his senior season. He graduated with a degree in Political Science. He currently does public and community service work for EBC High School in Bushwick, Brooklyn. He has two kids with his wife, Christiane.

References

1975 births
Living people
Basketball people from New York (state)
Continental Basketball Association referees
Midwood High School alumni
National Basketball Association referees
New Paltz Hawks men's basketball players
Sportspeople from Brooklyn
American men's basketball players